Joseph Miles Reiter (born circa 1950) is an American farmer and entrepreneur, and the CEO of Driscoll's, Inc., a global agribusiness specializing in fresh year-round berry production.

Biography
Miles Reiter is the grandson of Joseph "Ed" Reiter, co-founder along with R.O. Driscoll of the Driscoll's berry company. Following the family tradition, after graduation from Princeton University,  he became a strawberry farmer in around 1970 in the Pajaro Valley, and became the chairman of Driscoll's in 1998, becoming CEO in 2000.  Reiter works at Driscoll's corporate office in Watsonville, California at the mouth of the Pajaro Valley.  His daughter, Brie Reiter Smith, is following family tradition, farming blueberries in Chile, and his son is farming strawberries in Santa Maria, California.

Under Reiter's stewardship, Driscoll's has become the largest berry supplier in the United States.  He has served as chairman of the board of the California Strawberry Commission and of the Community Foundation of Santa Cruz County. He serves on the boards of the Produce Marketing Association (PMA) and has been a director of the Western Growers Association since November 2006. He served as a director of Produce Marketing Association from October 2008 to October 2011.

In April 2015, Reiter announced that Kevin Murphy, the company's then president and COO, would assume the CEO role.  J. Miles Reiter continues as chairman of the board.

In November 2018, Reiter reassumed the position of CEO.

Innovations and awards
Reiter has worked to improve strawberry varieties, expanding on the original Sweet Briar strawberries variety. Additional innovations in the industry have resulted in year-round production of fruit, making a steady presence of fruit in the supermarkets.  In 2009, under Reiter's stewardship, growers for the Driscoll's berry company opened three low-cost medical clinics that serve their 18,000 seasonal farm workers and family members in Watsonville, Santa Maria, and Oxnard.  In 2007, Reiter put a conservation easement on 103 acres of farmland to help save the Pajaro Valley from citification.

Contributions

Reiter has spoken publicly about the need for groundwater reform in California agriculture.  He has written an editorial statement published in 2015.

In addition, Reiter plays an active role in support of CERES.

References

Further reading
 
 
 
 

1940s births
Living people
Princeton University alumni
American farmers